Rokytnice may refer to several places in the Czech Republic:

Rokytnice (Přerov District), a municipality and village in the Olomouc Region
Rokytnice (Zlín District), a municipality and village in the Zlín Region
Rokytnice nad Jizerou, a town in the Liberec Region
Rokytnice nad Rokytnou, a market town in the Vysočina Region
Rokytnice v Orlických horách, a town in the Hradec Králové Region